The Fall of Ideals is the third studio album by metalcore band All That Remains, released on July 11, 2006. Three music videos were created for the songs "This Calling", "Not Alone" and "The Air That I Breathe". It is the only All That Remains release with drummer Shannon Lucas and the band's first album to feature bassist Jeanne Sagan. Musically, the album features a more melodic metalcore sound the band would be known for.

Overview
The Fall of Ideals was produced by the Killswitch Engage guitarist, Adam Dutkiewicz, and engineered by the Soilwork guitarist Peter Wichers. The album was the band's first to enter the Billboard 200 charts, at number 75, with just under 13,000 copies sold. On May 23, 2008, it was announced that the album had sold in excess of 175,000 copies worldwide.

The song "Six" is featured in Guitar Hero II. "This Calling" is available as downloadable content for Rock Band and is also used as the lead track for the Saw III soundtrack and on the Masters of Horror II soundtrack.

Track listing

Personnel
All That Remains
 Philip Labonte – vocals
 Oli Herbert – lead guitar
 Mike Martin – rhythm guitar
 Jeanne Sagan – bass guitar
 Shannon Lucas – drums

Production
 Produced and mixed by Adam Dutkiewicz
 Engineered by Peter Wichers
 Mastered by Alan Douches
 A&R by EJ Johantgen and Dan Fitzgerald

Charts

References

2006 albums
All That Remains (band) albums
Prosthetic Records albums
Razor & Tie albums
Albums produced by Adam Dutkiewicz